Hygrophoropsis psammophila is a species of fungus in the family Hygrophoropsidaceae. Originally described by John Burton Cleland in 1933 as Paxillus psammophilus, it was transferred to the genus Hygrophoropsis by Cheryl Grgurinovic in 1997. It is found in Australia, where it grows in groups in sand.

References

External links

Hygrophoropsidaceae
Fungi described in 1933
Fungi of Australia
Taxa named by John Burton Cleland